Aimo Vartiainen (born 14 July 1927) is a Finnish former alpine skier who competed in the 1948 Winter Olympics. He was born in Rovaniemi.

References

1927 births
Living people
People from Rovaniemi
Finnish male alpine skiers
Olympic alpine skiers of Finland
Alpine skiers at the 1948 Winter Olympics
Sportspeople from Lapland (Finland)